Hichem Samandi (born 13 August 1986, Tunis) is a Tunisian fencer. At the 2012 Summer Olympics, he competed in the Men's sabre, but was defeated in the first round.

References

Tunisian male sabre fencers
Living people
Olympic fencers of Tunisia
Fencers at the 2012 Summer Olympics
1986 births
People from Tunis
African Games silver medalists for Tunisia
African Games medalists in fencing
Competitors at the 2015 African Games
Competitors at the 2019 African Games
21st-century Tunisian people